Hon. Eliot Thomas Yorke MP DL was a British politician and barrister.

Background
Yorke was the third son of Vice-Admiral the Hon. Sir Joseph Sydney Yorke, second son of Charles Yorke, second son of Philip Yorke, 1st Earl of Hardwicke. His mother was Elizabeth Weake Rattray, daughter of James Rattray. Admiral Charles Yorke, 4th Earl of Hardwicke, was his elder brother. 
He was educated at Harrow, whence he proceeded to St. John's College, Cambridge, where be took the degree of M.A. in 1827. Mr. Yorke was called to the Bar by the Honourable Society of Lincoln's Inn in 1832. He was granted the precedence of an earl's son by Royal warrant in 1836. Yorke was a magistrate and deputy-lieutenant (DL) for Cambridgeshire, and for many years chairman of quarter sessions for that county. He was a director of the Bank of England

Political career
The Conservative party nominated Yorke, a barrister as one of their candidates on 12 January 1835 Yorke was elected as one of three representatives for Cambridgeshire in the 1835 general election, a seat he held until 1865.

Personal life
On 31 January 1833, Yorke married Emily Anne Millicent, daughter of Emilius Henry Delmé Radcliffe, in St. Mary, Hitchin, Hertfordshire. They had no children. He died on 3 May 1885, at 15 Park Street, Westminster, London, aged 80. Emily Yorke died on 1 January 1894, in Westminster, London.

References

External links 
 

1805 births
1885 deaths
Conservative Party (UK) MPs for English constituencies
UK MPs 1835–1837
UK MPs 1837–1841
UK MPs 1841–1847
UK MPs 1847–1852
UK MPs 1852–1857
UK MPs 1857–1859
UK MPs 1859–1865
Eliot